The Interviews: An Oral History of Television (formerly titled the Archive of American Television) is a project of the nonprofit Academy of Television Arts & Sciences Foundation in North Hollywood, Los Angeles, that records interviews with notable people from all aspects of the television industry.

The project has interviewed over 850 television pioneers and has posted over 500 videotaped interviews online. It is their ultimate goal to be the world's largest and most advanced oral history collection on the history of television. The archive's subjects include all professions within the television industry. Examples include: actors Fess Parker, William Shatner, Betty White, Alan Alda, James Garner, Mary Tyler Moore, Dick Van Dyke, Ossie Davis, Carol Burnett and Michael J. Fox; and producers Norman Lear, Carl Reiner, Chris Carter, Steven Bochco, Phil Rosenthal, Sherwood Schwartz, Fred Rogers and Dick Wolf; newscasters Walter Cronkite, Ed Bradley, Bob Schieffer and David Brinkley; executives Fred Silverman, Sumner Redstone, Leslie Moonves, Robert Johnson, Kay Koplovitz, Frank Stanton and Ted Turner; costume designers Bob Mackie and Nolan Miller; choreographers Tony Charmoli and Cyd Charisse; writers Roy Huggins, Tad Mosel, Sidney Sheldon, Abby Mann and Ann Marcus, among numerous others.

History
Motivated by Steven Spielberg's Survivors of the Shoah Visual History Foundation, which has videotaped testimonies of Holocaust survivors, Dean Valentine (former Disney Television and UPN president) was inspired to create a similar project for television.  Valentine developed and presented a proposal to the TV Academy, under then-president Richard H. Frank and Academy Foundation Chairman Thomas W. Sarnoff. NBC executive Grant Tinker, Award-winning producer David L. Wolper are the Archive's founding co-chairs. The creation of the Archive of American Television was co-founded and executive produced by Michael Rosen and overseen by James Loper, the Executive Director of the Academy of Television Arts & Sciences from 1984 until 1999.

Beginning in early 1996, the Archive of American Television completed its first six interviews as part of its pilot stage. The initial six interviews were with Elma Farnsworth, widow and lab assistant to the inventor of electronic television Philo Farnsworth; Leonard Goldenson, founder of ABC, Dick Smith, television's first make-up artist;  Ethel Winant, casting executive; Sheldon Leonard, show creator, actor, and director; and comedian Milton Berle. The Academy of Television Arts and Sciences Foundation officially launched the Archive of American Television in 1997 under the day-to-day leadership of Rosen and Sarnoff.

Thousands of hours of historic interviews have been completed with over 850 TV legends. Full-length video interviews currently online include actors Alan Alda, Richard Crenna, Barbara Eden, Jonathan Winters, Ossie Davis, Michael J. Fox, Dick Van Dyke, Dick Clark, Florence Henderson, Andy Griffith, Bob Newhart, William Shatner, Carl Reiner, and Mickey Rooney, writer and producers Norman Lear, Sherwood Schwartz, Steven Bochco, and Dick Wolf, writer Harlan Ellison, news legends Walter Cronkite, Ed Bradley, Robert MacNeil, Jim McKay, Mike Wallace and David Brinkley, and executives Fred Silverman, Leonard Goldenson and Ted Turner. Key players from the 1950s quiz show scandals were also interviewed: Herb Stempel and Albert Freedman.

TV Foundation Chairs Jerry Petry and Emeritus Thomas W. Sarnoff guide the day-to-day operations of the Archive. Archive staff, professors, scholars and journalists from around the country volunteer their time to conduct these interviews. The Foundation employs a small staff who prepare all of the research and questions in advance. Local video crews photograph each interview.

See also
 British Entertainment History Project

References

External links
 
 
 Archive of American Television on Google Cultural Institute
 Media Post (archived 7 January 2006)
 "A must-see TV archive"—Blog Spot
 Hollywood Reporter article on Archive 6/4/2007
 Army Archerd column on the Archive of American Television's 10th Anniversary celebration 6/5/2007

Television archives in the United States
1997 establishments in California
Oral history